John Wethered (May 8, 1809 – February 15, 1888) was a U.S. Representative from Maryland.

Early life
John Wethered was born on May 8, 1809 in Baltimore County, Maryland. He completed preparatory studies.

Career
Wethered held several local offices, and engaged in the manufacture of woolen goods at Wetheredville, which was later renamed Dickeyville and incorporated into Baltimore City.

Wethered was elected as a Whig to the Twenty-eighth Congress (March 4, 1843 – March 3, 1845). He was nominated as the Whig candidate for the Thirty-third Congress, but lost to Jacob Shower. After his tenure in Congress, he resumed the manufacture of woolen goods. He also served as delegate from Baltimore County to the State convention which framed the Constitution of Maryland in 1867. He retired from active pursuits in 1868 and lived on his estate, "Ashland", near Catonsville, Maryland.

Death
Wethered died at Ashland on February 15, 1888. He is interred in Greenmount Cemetery in Baltimore, Maryland.

References

1809 births
1888 deaths
Whig Party members of the United States House of Representatives from Maryland
People from Baltimore County, Maryland
People from Catonsville, Maryland
19th-century American politicians